The London and North Eastern Railway (LNER) Class V2 2-6-2 steam locomotives were designed by Sir Nigel Gresley for express mixed traffic work, and built at the LNER shops at Doncaster and Darlington between 1936 and 1944. The best known is the first of the class, 4771 (later 800 and 60800) Green Arrow, which is the sole survivor of the class.

Construction
The V2s were the only major class of 2-6-2 tender locomotives used in Britain. Whilst 2-6-2T tank locomotives were common in the UK, the only other 2-6-2 tender locomotives were the unsuccessful experimental Midland Railway Paget locomotive of 1908, and the two examples of Gresley's LNER Class V4 of 1941. The wheel arrangement allowed the fitting of a large firebox uninhibited by the rear driving wheel, and the front pony truck improved stability at high speeds.

The V2 was derived from the Class A1/A3 pacifics with smaller driving wheels (of  compared to ) and a shortened boiler. It retained Gresley's favoured 3-cylinder arrangement. Unusually all 3 cylinders were part of a single 'monobloc' casting.

184 locomotives were built in 14 batches between 1936 and 1944 at Doncaster and Darlington Works, construction continuing through the Second World War as they proved their usefulness. A further four locomotives, ordered as V2s, were redesigned by Gresley's successor Edward Thompson and completed as Pacifics (LNER Thompson Class A2/1).

The V2 was a versatile locomotive, capable of hauling fast fitted freights and express passenger trains. Their relatively heavy 22 ton axle load meant their use was restricted to around 40% of the LNER's route miles. For example, they were barred from all of the former Great Eastern Railway main lines. Gresley recognised that a lighter mixed-traffic locomotive was required, and the V4 class was designed to this end. However, it was to be the versatile LNER Thompson Class B1 4-6-0 which succeeded the V2 as the LNER's standard mixed traffic locomotive, although the B1 never matched the V2's power output.

Working life

First of the initial batch for five Doncaster-built V2s was number 4771, which emerged in June 1936 and was promptly named "Green Arrow", after the express freight service for which the locomotives had been built. Successful trials with this quintet led to both Doncaster and Darlington works producing further batches. The final locomotive, number 3695, was delivered from Darlington in July 1944.

The V2 had the free steaming qualities that the LNER's operating department required. In peak condition a V2 could almost match the Pacifics for sustained high speed running.

The V2s were recognised as versatile and powerful locomotives by 1939, but their reputation was more firmly established by their remarkable feats of haulage during World War II. Trains of over 20 carriages loaded to  proved within their abilities. On at least one occasion a single V2 hauled 26 coaches from Peterborough to London. Given this capacity for work it was not surprising that construction was allowed to continue through the war years. The V2s performed equally competently for British Railways, leaving their mark on the East Coast Main Line, the Waverley Route between Carlisle and Edinburgh and on the ex-Great Central main line between London Marylebone and Sheffield.

Significant modifications were made to the V2 class during its service life. In 1946 a series of derailments was traced to the design of the leading pony truck, which was unduly sensitive to the often poor track conditions, a legacy of heavy wartime use and lack of maintenance. Modifications to the suspension cured the problem. During the 1950s cracks in the 3 cylinder monoblocs became increasingly frequent, but replacing them was expensive and in 1956 the decision was taken to replace the monobloc with separate cylinder castings. Seventy-one engines were thus modified: they can be identified by the presence of external steam pipes from smokebox to cylinders. Finally, around 1960 experiments were made with fitting double chimneys to two V2s. This yielded no significant performance gain, but eight engines were subsequently fitted with Kylchap exhausts. These so-called 'Super V2s' were reckoned to be fully equal in performance to the larger Pacifics. However, plans to fit Kylchap chimneys to the remainder of the class were abandoned once it became clear that replacement with diesel locomotives was imminent.

The V2s' swansong came on the Edinburgh—Aberdeen run, working alongside the last LNER A2s and A4s. The entire class was withdrawn from service between 1962 and 1966.

Accidents and incidents
Two people were killed and seven were injured.
 On 5 January 1946, a freight train became divided on the East Coast Main Line in County Durham. The front portion was brought to a halt at Browney Signalbox, but the rear portion crashed into it. The wreckage fouled signal cables, giving a false clear signal to a passenger train hauled by locomotive No. 4895. This train collided with the wreckage, Ten people were killed.
The wreckage fouled signal cables, giving a false clear to an express passenger train hauled by locomotive No. 4876, which collided with the wreckage. A third passenger train hauled by locomotive No. 4833 was travelling in the opposite direction, and it crashed into the wreckage. Two people were killed.
On 9 August 1947, locomotive no. 936 was hauling a passenger train that was in a rear-end collision with another at  due to a signalman's error. Twenty-one people were killed and 188 were injured.
Locomotive No. 60891 was hauling an express freight train which ran into the wreckage and was also derailed.
On 19 April 1955, locomotive No. 60968 was in collision with Fairburn tank No. 42085 at  station, Northumberland. Both locomotives were derailed.
On 7 August 1958, a locomotive of the class was hauling an express passenger train that was derailed at Barby, Northamptonshire due to excessive speed through a crossover. One person was killed and seventeen were injured. Errors by a pilotman and confusion over where the train was to be diverted during a period of single line working were major contributory factors. 
On 19 November 1958, a freight train overran signals and was involved in a rear-end collision with another at Hitchin, Hertfordshire. Locomotive No. 60885 was hauling a third freight train, which ran into the wreckage and was derailed.
On 15 December 1961, an empty coaching stock train was in a rear-end collision with a freight train at Conington, Huntingdonshire during permissive block working. A second freight train then ran into the wreckage. Locomotive No. 60977 was hauling a freight train which then ran into the wreckage.

Names

Only eight V2s were named; seven by the LNER and one by BR. The first of the class was named after the express freight train Green Arrow. Five more were named after Regiments and two after public schools. It is probable that more would have been named had the outbreak of war not intervened.

Numbering
When built, the V2s were numbered 3641–3695 and 4771–4899. Under the LNER 1946 renumbering scheme they were to be renumbered 700-883 but the range 800–983 was allocated before renumbering was completed (19 locomotives briefly carried numbers in the original range). After nationalisation in 1948, British Railways added 60000 to their numbers so they became 60800–60983. BR also gave them the power classification 6MT.

Withdrawal
All 184 V2s were withdrawn from stock between February 1962 and December 1966. The last ones in service were No. 60831 and No. 60836 had the distinction of being Gresley's last big engines to be in service. No. 60831 and No. 60836 were withdrawn on 6 December 1966 and 31 December 1966 respectively. Both of them were scrapped the following year. The surviving V2 no 4771/60800 Green Arrow was withdrawn in August 1962 from Kings Cross shed.

Preservation

One Class V2 survives. The first of the class 4771 Green Arrow has been preserved as part of the National Collection, and was in use on preserved lines around Britain. On 1 April 2008, it suffered a boiler failure on the North Yorkshire Moors Railway and has since been a static exhibit at the National Railway Museum. Its boiler repairs have been determined as achievable, however the NRM are not currently willing to meet the cost involved in replacing the 'monobloc' cylinder casting. A crack in this means the casting now needs to be replaced before the locomotive can work again. It is unfortunate that 60800 was not one of the V2 class that were modified to incorporate separate cylinder blocks, when a lot of the class were modified in the 1940s and 1950s.

Modelling
Bachmann are currently producing a new 'OO gauge' model including an updated DCC ready chassis:

35-200
Class V2 Gresley 2-6-2 4791 LNER Lined Green (Original).

35-201
Class V2 Gresley 2-6-2 60845 in BR lined black with early emblem.

35-202
Class V2 Gresley 2-6-2 60847 "St Peters School" in BR lined green with late crest.

Older (pre 2012) Bachmann models had a split chassis design which required a lot of modification to convert to DCC.

References

Sources

Literature

External links

 LNER encyclopedia
 Class V2 Details at Rail UK
 York Steam, Steam Locos - In York

V2
2-6-2 locomotives
1′C1′ h3 locomotives
Railway locomotives introduced in 1936
Standard gauge steam locomotives of Great Britain